The ITV Telethons were three charity telethons organised and televised in the United Kingdom by the ITV network. They took place in 1988, 1990 and 1992. Each lasted for 27 hours and all were hosted by Michael Aspel. The final telethon in July 1992 raised £15,012,989.

Thames Telethon (1980 & 1985)
The ITV Telethon originated from the 10-hour Thames Telethon, which ran in the Thames/London ITV region only, on 2 October 1980, one month before the BBC's Children in Need appeal the same year. Thames broadcast another Telethon on 29–30 October 1985.

ITV Telethon (1988–1992)
The US-style continuous broadcast raised £1.25 million, and was considered such a success that a 27-hour marathon was broadcast across the entire network over 29 and 30 May 1988 (a Sunday and Bank Holiday Monday), involving participation and input from all of the regional broadcasters around the country. It had the aim of raising money for disability charities across the United Kingdom.

A further two ITV Telethons followed in 1990 (across Sunday 27 May and Monday 28 May) and 1992 (across Saturday 18 July and Sunday 19 July), raising £24,127,917 and £15,012,989 respectively. Michael Aspel was the frontman for all three. Telethon helped thousands of charities in the UK. Many local ITV companies like Tyne Tees Television and Television South West contributed from company profits. In the TVS region alone, TVS donated £1 million from its own charity, the TVS Trust in late May 1990.

Like the telethons in the US, the ITV Telethons also offered regional cut-ins by ITV companies all over the country, featuring personalities and local celebrities from that region such as Richard Whiteley for Yorkshire Television or Ruth Madoc for HTV Wales.

One regional cut-in for the 1992 Telethon took place in the grounds outside Granada TV, Quay Street studio, and a non-stop 27-hour live stage presentation 'The Blackpool Roadshow' was gifted and coordinated by brother and sister Shirley Pearson and Johnnie Doolan. Amongst the many stage appearances was reportedly the first ever live set from the later famous band Oasis with guest appearances from chart topping artists, and choreographed sets from Blackpool show - Mystique.

Bisto gravy powder drums and packets sponsored the event.

Protests and closure 
The 1990 and 1992 ITV Telethons were subject to protests organised by Block Telethon, an informal protest group of disabled people that believed that the telethons reinforced negative stereotypes of disabled people. The 1990 protest was modestly attended, whereas the 1992 protest with over 1000 disabled people outside the LWT studios on the South Bank was credited with ending the Telethon series, and indirectly leading to developments such as Comic Relief. This protest group Block Telethon formally became the Disabled People's Direct Action Network in 1993, which campaigned with other organisations against discrimination and for civil rights, leading up to the Disability Discrimination Act 1995.

References

External links
.

1980 in British television
1985 in British television
1988 in British television
1990 in British television
1992 in British television
British telethons
ITV (TV network) original programming